GNAT Programming Studio (GPS, formerly known as the GNAT Programming System) is a free multi-language integrated development environment (IDE) by AdaCore. GPS uses compilers from the GNU Compiler Collection, taking its name from GNAT, the GNU compiler for the Ada programming language.

GPS is cross-platform, running on Linux, FreeBSD, Microsoft Windows, macOS, and Solaris. GPS uses GTK+ as the widget toolkit for its graphical user interface. Released under the GNU General Public License, GPS is free software.

Features
GPS supports a variety of programming languages other than Ada, including C, JavaScript, Pascal and Python. In addition, it supports a number of other file types for build systems such as Autoconf and Make, along with documentation formats like Changelog and Texinfo.

The most interesting new development function of GPS from version 4.0 are remote edit, remote debug and cross-compilation capabilities for platforms for which GPS/GCC are not natively available.

The new version also includes new edit functions, among which is an intelligent autocomplete feature.

GPS supports the following Version control systems: CVS, Rational ClearCase, Subversion, git.

GPS can edit files encoded in all GNAT supported encoding schemas. In detail: ISO-8859-1, ISO-8859-2, ISO-8859-5, ISO-8859-6, ISO-8859-7, KOI8-R, Shift JIS, GB 2312, UTF-8, UTF-16 and UTF-32.

GPS uses Python as a scripting language.

See also

 Comparison of integrated development environments

References

External links
 Official GPS Homepage
 GNU Ada Project on SourceForge.net
 GNAT Reference Manual
 AdaCore's GNAT Pro Development Environment to Support Boeing's Real-time Simulation Systems
 Environment accelerated Ada programming

Ada (programming language)
Cross-platform free software
Free integrated development environments
Free software programmed in Ada
GNU Project software
Linux integrated development environments